Moussa al-Omar (born 7 May 1981) is a Syrian journalist and presenter.

Biography 
al-Omar was born in Idlib, Syria, to parents from Taftanaz, he was raised in Damascus. He studied high school in Damascus and graduated from University of Damascus in 2004.

Career 
He began his career as journalist and presenter for Sham TV, and he was one of the founders of the channel before it was closed down by Syrian authorities in 2006. He then moved to Dubai to work with International News. At the beginning of 2010, al-Omar moved to London, United Kingdom and started working with Al Hiwar Channel, where he served as a presenter on shows such as Event's highlights and Great Arab Uprising. On 14 June 2012, Moussa announced on his page in Facebook and Twitter officially resigned from Alhiwar Channel.

Personal life 
al-Omar was a supporter of the Syrian uprising and covered many charities related to this issue. Moussa al-Omar currently resides in London.

References 

Journalist's home destroyed by tanks, family's passports seized
London-based journalist Moussa Al-Omar’s family home attacked

External links 
 Moussa al-Omar on Twitter .

1981 births
Living people
Syrian journalists
Damascus University alumni
People from Damascus
People from Idlib
Journalists from London
Syrian emigrants to the United Kingdom